Zbehňov is a village and municipality in the Trebišov District in the Košice Region of south-eastern Slovakia.

History
In historical records the village was first mentioned in 1290.

Geography
The village lies at an altitude of 176 metres and covers an area of 5.032 km².
It has a population of about 290 people.

Ethnicity
The village is about 73% Slovak and 27% Gypsy.

Facilities
The village has a church and a football pitch.

External links
https://web.archive.org/web/20071116010355/http://www.statistics.sk/mosmis/eng/run.html

Villages and municipalities in Trebišov District